Arkada Bank was a public joint stock bank based in Ukraine. Its head office was situated in Kyiv.

The bank was declared insolvent in 2020 and its liquidation will be completed in 2023. A criminal case for the embezzlement of ₴9 billion of funds for financing the construction of Arkada Bank is ongoing. More than 90% of the bank's depositors (more than 5,000 people) will be refunded their deposits in full.

See also

List of banks in Ukraine

References

External links

Global Money Transfer

Defunct banks of Ukraine
Banks disestablished in 2020
2020 disestablishments in Ukraine